The Hopeless Fountain Kingdom World Tour was the second headlining concert tour by American singer-songwriter Halsey, in support of her  second studio album Hopeless Fountain Kingdom (2017). The tour began on September 29, 2017, in Uncasville, Connecticut, at the Mohegan Sun Arena and concluded on September 26, 2018, in Berlin, Germany, at Columbiahalle. In 2017, the tour grossed $9.2 million from 28 shows with 340,983 tickets sold across North America.

Halsey announced "Installment I" of the tour, the North American leg, on May 5, 2017, about a month before the release of Hopeless Fountain Kingdom. Along with this announcement Halsey commented "this is the biggest tour I've ever done. and I'm gonna bring u the biggest show to go with it", and revealed that Canadian rapper PartyNextDoor and British singer Charli XCX would serve as opening acts. Tickets for the North American leg of the tour went on sale to the general public on May 12, 2017. Various VIP ticket options called "Angelus", "Aureum", "Solis" and "Luna" were also made available. On December 13, 2017 Halsey announced five shows in Oceania as "Installment II" of the tour; these shows took place in April 2018, and were supported by Kehlani. More shows were added as "The Final Installment" with shows in North America, Asia and Europe including support from Lauren Jauregui, Jessie Reyez, NIKI, Alma and Raye.

Set list
{{Hidden
| headercss = background: #CECEF2; font-size: 100%; width: 100%;
| contentcss = text-align: left; font-size: 100%; width: 95%;
| header = September 29, 2017—July 8, 2018	
| content = 
This set list is representative of the show on October 31, 2017, in Phoenix, Arizona.

 "The Prologue" 
 "Eyes Closed"
 "Hold Me Down"
 "Castle"
 "Good Mourning" 
 "Heaven in Hiding"
 "Strangers"
 "Roman Holiday"
 "Walls Could Talk"
 "Bad at Love"
 "Alone"
 "Closer" 
 "Sorry"
 "Angel on Fire"
 "Lie"
 "Don't Play"
 "Ghost"
 "Is There Somewhere"
 "Now or Never"
 "Colors"
 "Young God"
Encore
  "Hopeless" 
 "Gasoline"
 "Hurricane"

}}
{{Hidden
| headercss = background: #CECEF2; font-size: 100%; width: 100%;
| contentcss = text-align: left; font-size: 100%; width: 95%;
| header = July 11—September 26, 2018
| content = This setlist is representative of the East Providence show on July 11, 2018, it does not represent all concerts for the duration of the tour.

 "The Prologue" 
 "Eyes Closed"
 "Gasoline"
 "Castle"
 "Heaven in Hiding"
 "Strangers"
 "Control"
 "Lie"
 "Don't Play"
 "Hurricane"
 "Colors"
 "Closer"
 "Sorry"
 "Alone"
 "Walls Could Talk"
 "New Americana"
 "Now or Never"
 "Young God"
Encore
  "Hold Me Down"
 "Is There Somewhere" 
 "Bad at Love"

}}

Shows

Cancelled shows

Notes

References

Halsey (singer) concert tours
2017 concert tours
2018 concert tours